Christian Nelson Saugen (January 1, 1852 – July 28, 1930) was a member of the Wisconsin State Assembly.

Biography
A Norwegian emigrant, Saugen was born on January 1, 1852. He moved with his parents to Trempealeau County, Wisconsin in 1866. In 1876, he moved Pleasant Valley, Eau Claire County, Wisconsin.

Career
Saugen was elected to the Assembly in 1904, 1916, 1922, 1924, 1926 and 1928. Additionally, he was a member of the County Board of Eau Claire County, Wisconsin and Assessor of Pleasant Valley. He was a Republican.

References

External links

Norwegian emigrants to the United States
People from Trempealeau County, Wisconsin
People from Eau Claire County, Wisconsin
Republican Party members of the Wisconsin State Assembly
1852 births
1930 deaths